György "George" Kulcsar (born 8 December 1967) is a former footballer who played in Australia for AIS, Canberra City and St. George Saints, in Belgium for Royal Antwerp, in England for Bradford City (scoring once against Wolverhampton Wanderers) and Queens Park Rangers (scoring once against Crystal Palace), and in Singapore for Home United. Born in Hungary, he won three caps with the Australia national team.

Career
Kulcsar suffered from meningitis in 1999.

In 2005, after a stint as the technical director of ANU Football Club, Kulcsar was appointed as Southern NSW Football's full-time coaching development manager.

In 2017, Kulcsar was suspended for 13 months from attending any soccer games following an incident where he, as the coach, entered the field of play and headbutted a player.

Kulcsar and his wife Petra Kulcsar run a retail shop.

References

1967 births
Living people
Sportspeople from Budapest
Naturalised citizens of Australia
Australian soccer players
Australia international soccer players
Australian expatriate sportspeople in England
Expatriate footballers in Belgium
Expatriate footballers in England
Expatriate footballers in Singapore
English Football League players
Bradford City A.F.C. players
Queens Park Rangers F.C. players
Royal Antwerp F.C. players
Australian expatriate soccer players
Australian people of Hungarian descent
Australian Institute of Sport soccer players
Home United FC players
Singapore Premier League players
Association football defenders